George Goddard may refer to:
George Goddard (cricketer) (born 1938), Scottish cricketer
George Goddard (footballer) (1903–1987), English-born footballer of the 1920s and 1930s
George Goddard (Mormon) (1815–1899), English Mormon pioneer and leader in The Church of Jesus Christ of Latter-day Saints
George William Goddard (1889–1987), United States Air Force general
George 'Sonny' Goddard (1924–1988), steelpan musician
George Bouverie Goddard (1832–1886), British sporting and animal painter and illustrator